France Ô was a French free-to-air television channel featuring programming from the French overseas departments and collectivities in Metropolitan France. It was part of the France Télévisions group. It was a national counterpart of the local Outre-Mer 1ère networks.

History
The channel was launched in 1998 as RFO Sat by Jean-Marie Cavada, then-president of RFO, and initially broadcast for only 9 hours per day. It was re-branded as France Ô on 25 February 2005 after the reunification of RFO with France Télévisions. The "O" stands for Outre-mer (overseas); the circumflex, which is considered an accent in French grammar, was used to emphasize that the channel was open to diverse accents and dialects, as well as to ensure that the name was not read as France 0 ("France zero").

The channel became available in overseas territories in November 2010, replacing the RFO-operated Tempo, and was launched in DTT nationally the same year.

Closure

In July 2018 the French government announced the closure of France Ô due to declining viewership. The ceasing of broadcast was scheduled for 9 August 2020, in time for the climax of the 2020 Summer Olympics, but was later pushed to 24 August due to scheduling issues caused by the COVID-19 pandemic, which resulted in the games being initially delayed to 2021. The last programme broadcast on the channel was a repeat of the concert L'Outre-mer fait son Olympia 2019. After this, the channel only broadcast a loop of commercials promoting a new France Télévisions portal for overseas territories, known as "Portail des Outre-mer La 1ère", in addition to other overseas-themed programs on other France Télévisions channels. Its signal was permanently cut off on 2 September.

See also 
 BBC World News
 Bermuda Broadcasting
 Caribbean Broadcast Network
 Gibraltar Broadcasting Corporation
 RTV-7
 TeleAruba
 TeleCuraçao

References 

France Télévisions
French-language television stations
Television channels and stations established in 1998
1998 establishments in France
Defunct television channels in France
Television channels and stations disestablished in 2020
2020 disestablishments in France